Earl Jerome Little (born March 10, 1973) is a former American football player. He played professional football as a defensive back in the National Football League (NFL) for nine years from 1997 to 2005 with the New Orleans Saints, Cleveland Browns, and Green Bay Packers. Little played college football at the University of Miami.

Professional career

New Orleans Saints
Little was signed as an undrafted free agent before the 1997 NFL season. He started on special teams and was a backup cornerback. His special teams coach, Bobby April, always praised Little outstanding special teams play. During the third preseason game vs the Denver Broncos, he made a big hit and he was taken off the field because of a concussion. Little missed the last preseason game and the first three games of the 1999 season. He was released by the Saints on October 24, 1999.

Cleveland Browns
He was picked up by the Browns off Waivers from the Saints on October 26, 1999. After having an outstanding season, Little signed a three-year multimillion-dollar contract. After having three good seasons (2001–2003), the Browns rewarded him with a five-year multimillion-dollar contract. He spent six seasons with the Browns until being released on 1 April 2005.

Green Bay Packers
Little was signed as a free agent on April 15, 2005. Little pulled his hamstring on October 4, 2005 on Monday Night Football vs Carolina Panthers. He was placed on injured reserve. To make room for a roster spot, he was released on November 23, 2005. Even though he was done for the remainder of the season, Little received his full salary for the 2005 season.

References

1973 births
Living people
American football safeties
Cleveland Browns players
Green Bay Packers players
Miami Hurricanes football players
Michigan Wolverines football players
New Orleans Saints players
Players of American football from Miami